Atari 50: The Anniversary Celebration, or simply Atari 50, is a video game compilation and interactive documentary about the history of Atari that comprises newly shot interviews with former Atari employees, archival footage, emulated games from the company's catalog, and six new games inspired by Atari classics. It was developed by Digital Eclipse and released on Atari VCS, Nintendo Switch, Microsoft Windows, PlayStation 4, PlayStation 5, Xbox One, and Xbox Series X/S in 2022, the 50th anniversary of Atari's founding. The main feature of the game is an interactive timeline that lays out the history of the company and its products in an intuitive way.

Critics have compared Atari 50 favorably to a museum or traditional documentary. They praised its thoroughness and hoped other developers would receive a similar treatment. The Verge called it an achievement in video game preservation.

List of games available 
There are 103 games available in the collection.

Arcade 

 Akka Arrh (unreleased)
 Asteroids (1979)
 Asteroids Deluxe (1981)
 Black Widow (1982)
 Breakout (1976)
 Centipede (1980)
 Cloak & Dagger (1984)
 Crystal Castles (1983)
 Fire Truck (1978)
 Food Fight (1983)
 Gravitar (1982)
 I, Robot (1984)
 Liberator (1982)
 Lunar Lander (1979)
 Major Havoc (1983)
 Maze Invaders (unreleased)
 Millipede (1982)
 Missile Command (1980)
 Pong (1972)
 Quantum (1982)
 Space Duel (1982)
 Sprint 8 (1977)
 Super Breakout (1978)
 Tempest (1981)
 Warlords (1980)

Atari 2600 
 Denotes a game that must be unlocked ingame to be played.

 3D Tic-Tac-Toe (1978)
 Adventure (1980)
 Air-Sea Battle (1977)
 Asteroids (1981)
 Basic Math (1977) 
 Breakout (1978) 
 Canyon Bomber (1979)
 Centipede (1983)
 Combat (1977)
 Combat Two (unreleased) 
 Crystal Castles (1984)
 Dark Chambers (1989)
 Demons to Diamonds (1982)
 Dodge 'Em (1980)
 Fatal Run (1990)
 Gravitar (1983) 
 Haunted House (1982)
 Millipede (1984)
 Miner 2049er (1983)
 Missile Command (1981)
 Outlaw (1978)
 Quadrun (1983)
 Race 500 (1977) 
 RealSports Baseball (1982)
 RealSports Basketball (unreleased)
 RealSports Boxing (1987)
 RealSports Football (1982)
 RealSports Soccer (1983)
 RealSports Tennis (1983)
 RealSports Volleyball (1982)
 Saboteur (unreleased)
 Secret Quest (1989)
 Solaris (1986)
 Super Breakout (1981)
 Surround (1977)
 Swordquest: EarthWorld (1982)
 Swordquest: FireWorld (1983)
 Swordquest: WaterWorld (1983)
 Warlords (1981)
 Yars' Revenge (1982)

Atari 5200 

 Bounty Bob Strikes Back! (1985)
 Millipede (unreleased)
 Missile Command (1982)
 Star Raiders (1982)
 Super Breakout (1982)

Atari 7800 

 Asteroids (1986)
 Basketbrawl (1990)
 Centipede (1986)
 Dark Chambers (1989)
 Fatal Run (1990)
 Ninja Golf (1990)
 Scrapyard Dog (1990)

Atari 8-bit family 

 Bounty Bob Strikes Back! (1984)
 Caverns of Mars (1981)
 Food Fight (1986)
 Miner 2049er (1982)
 Yoomp! (2007)

Lynx 

 Basketbrawl (1992)
 Malibu Bikini Volleyball (1993)
 Scrapyard Dog (1991)
 Super Asteroids & Missile Command (1995)
 Turbo Sub (1991)

Jaguar 

 Atari Karts (1995)
 Club Drive (1994)
 Cybermorph (1993)
 Evolution: Dino Dudes (1993)
 Fight for Life (1996)
 Missile Command 3D (1995)
 Ruiner Pinball (1995)
 Tempest 2000 (1994)
 Trevor McFur in the Crescent Galaxy (1993)

New games 
Games that were developed exclusively for Atari 50 by Digital Eclipse.

 Haunted Houses – 3D remake of Haunted House;
 Neo Breakout – Remake of Breakout;
 Quadratank – 4-player version of Tank;
 Swordquest: AirWorld – Lost version of the fourth game from Swordquest;
 Touch Me – Digital version from a handheld game;
 VCTR-SCTR – Tribute of vector games, inspired by Asteroids, Lunar Lander, Battlezone and Tempest;
 Yars' Revenge Enhanced – Modern version of Yars' Revenge.

Development

Reception 

Atari 50: The Anniversary Celebration on Nintendo Switch, PC, PlayStation 5, and Xbox Series X and Series S garnered "generally favorable reviews", according to review aggregator site Metacritic.

References

External links

2022 video games
Atari games
Atari video game compilations
Digital Eclipse games
Nintendo Switch games
PlayStation 4 games
PlayStation 5 games
Web documentaries
Windows games
Xbox One games
Xbox Series X and Series S games
Multiplayer and single-player video games